The 1952 Norwegian Football Cup was the 47th season of the Norwegian annual knockout football tournament. The tournament was open for all members of NFF, except those from Northern Norway. The final was played at Ullevaal Stadion in Oslo on 26 October 1952, and was contested by Sparta and Solberg, who both made their first appearance in the cup final. Sparta secured their first title with a 3–2 win, having scored all five goals in the final.

First round

|-
|colspan="3" style="background-color:#97DEFF"|Replay

|}

Second round

|-
|colspan="3" style="background-color:#97DEFF"|Replay

|}

Third round

|colspan="3" style="background-color:#97DEFF"|27 July 1952

|-
|colspan="3" style="background-color:#97DEFF"|Replay: 17 August 1952

|}

Fourth round

|colspan="3" style="background-color:#97DEFF"|17 August 1952

|-
|colspan="3" style="background-color:#97DEFF"|31 August 1952

|}

Quarter-finals

|colspan="3" style="background-color:#97DEFF"|21 September 1952

|-
|colspan="3" style="background-color:#97DEFF"|Replay: 28 September 1952

|}

Semi-finals

|colspan="3" style="background-color:#97DEFF"|12 October 1952

|}

Final

See also
1951–52 Norwegian Main League
1952 in Norwegian football

References

Norwegian Football Cup seasons
Norway
Cup